Wickham Market railway station is on the East Suffolk Line in the east of England, located in Campsea Ashe, Suffolk, approximately  east of Wickham Market itself. Its three-letter station code is WCM.

It is managed by Abellio Greater Anglia, which also operates all trains that call.

Wickham Market was formerly a junction for the Framlingham branch line. The branch closed to passenger services in November 1952, and to freight in April 1965.

History
The main line and the Framlingham branch both opened on 1 June 1859, and Wickham Market station opened at the same time. The ESR was absorbed by the ECR on opening day.

On 1 July 1862, the ECR and other small railway companies were amalgamated to form the Great Eastern Railway (GER). Upon the 1923 Grouping, the GER was combined with other railways into the London and North Eastern Railway; this in turn was a constituent of British Railways at the start of 1948.

The Framlingham branch closed to passenger trains in November 1952; it retained freight services until April 1965. In the meantime, the goods yard at Wickham Market closed in July 1964.

With the privatisation of British Rail, ownership of the line and station passed to Railtrack on 1 April 1994. The franchise to operate the passenger services on this route was won by Anglia Railways in 1997; in 2004 National Express won the franchise and operated services using the brand name 'one', which was renamed National Express East Anglia in 2008. In February 2012, the operation of the train service was taken over by Abellio Greater Anglia, a company run by Abellio, the trading name of Dutch railways.

Services
 the typical Monday-Sunday off-peak service at Wickham Market is as follows:

Trains direct to and from London Liverpool Street were withdrawn in 2010.

Notes

References

External links 

Railway stations in Suffolk
DfT Category F1 stations
Former Great Eastern Railway stations
Railway stations in Great Britain opened in 1859
Greater Anglia franchise railway stations